Sumatra's East Coast Residency was an administrative subdivision of the Dutch East Indies with its capital in Medan. It was located in northern Sumatra.

Formation
From the early 19th century the Dutch gradually took control of Sumatra, starting from the south. In Eastern Indonesia, the sultanates of Asahan, Serdang, Deli and Langkat were subjugated between 1662 and 1865, and these sultans were subsequently used by the Dutch to indirectly rule the 'native states', as they became known. The inland Batak areas were under Dutch control by 1895. The East Coast Residency was established in 1873, and took its final form in 1908 after Tamiang, a small area in the north, was transferred to Aceh

Notes

References